"Bad Girl (At Night)" is a song by Dave Spoon, featuring Lisa Maffia on vocals. It was released as a digital download single on 27 August 2007, followed by a CD release on 1 September through Apollo Recordings. The music video shows Maffia in a house set around people with hangovers. It reached the top 10 in Finland. In the UK, the song peaked at No. 36.

Charts

References

2007 singles
2007 songs
Lisa Maffia songs
British house music songs